Paula Lehtomäki (born 29 November 1972 in Kuhmo, Finland) is a Finnish politician. She started her political career in 1996, when she was elected to the Kuhmo town council. In 1999 she was elected to the Finnish Parliament, and again in 2003. In 2002, she was elected as the vice-chairman of Keskusta. In April 2004, she was chosen as the Minister for Foreign Trade and Development, making her the youngest minister in Matti Vanhanen's first cabinet.

She is married and the mother of three children. Her hobbies include cross country skiing, cycling, Nordic walking, badminton, and karaoke.

On 17 April 2007 it was announced that she would be the Minister for Environment in Matti Vanhanen's second cabinet. At the same time it was also announced that she is pregnant, and would take her second maternity leave from a ministerial post later in 2007.

She was Secretary General of the Nordic Council of Ministers from 2019 - 2022. She is the first woman to hold the position, as well as the first person under 50. In her free time she sometimes sings in a band called Punatähdet, which means Red Star.

See also 
 Finance scandal of election in 2007 in Finland

References

External links

Keskusta party home page (in Finnish, English and Swedish)

1972 births
Living people
People from Kuhmo
Finnish Lutherans
Centre Party (Finland) politicians
Minister of the Environment of Finland
Members of the Parliament of Finland (1999–2003)
Members of the Parliament of Finland (2003–07)
Members of the Parliament of Finland (2007–11)
Members of the Parliament of Finland (2011–15)
Members of the Parliament of Finland (2015–19)
Women government ministers of Finland
21st-century Finnish women politicians
Women members of the Parliament of Finland